Why I Am a Hindu is a 2018 book by Indian politician Shashi Tharoor. In the book, Tharoor writes about the history of Hinduism and its core tenets, as well as socio-cultural developments in India that relate to the religion, while elucidating his own religious convictions.

Tharoor intended the book to be a repudiation of Hindu nationalism, and its rise in Indian society, which relied upon an interpretation of the religion which was markedly different from the one with which he had grown up, and was familiar with. In seeking to address this concern, he wanted to position the debate as one within the Hindu faith, and therefore wrote about his own personal identification with the religion.

The book is segmented into three parts. In the first part, Tharoor offers a brief history of Hinduism, and the development of his own personal faith. In the second part, he traces the rise of modern Hindu nationalism in the form of the Hindutva movement. The third part Tharoor explores the deplorable aspects of Hindutva politics trying to reclaim Hinduism for the liberals.

Tharoor’s 2019 book The Hindu Way - An Introduction To Hinduism is a follow up to the Why I Am a Hindu.

Reception
Kancha Ilaiah writing for The Caravan, wrote a critical book review in which he questioned the theories put forth by Tharoor for praising Hinduism while being unaware of his own caste.  MK Raghavendra of Firstpost wrote that “books such as Shashi Tharoor’s 'Why I am a Hindu' simply take sides in the Left vs Right unproductive struggle, without adding much of intellectual value to the socio-political issues confronting India today.”

Raheel Shakeel reviewed the book for Newsline, calling it “timely” which “comes at a time when India is at a crossroads”. He further wrote that “the book simplifies the many strands of Hindu thought for a general audience, and outlines the threat posed to it by the enemy within.”  Urmi Chanda-Vaz of Scroll called the book “a timely reminder of why Hinduism must retain its pluralism”. She further wrote that “Why I Am A Hindu is as balanced a book on religion as one can hope to write in these tumultuous times.” However she criticised the last section of the book titled “Taking Back Hinduism” to have been written in a hurry.

References

2018 non-fiction books
Books by Shashi Tharoor
Aleph Book Company books